Dixie Lucile Reiniger Willson (30 July 1890 - 6 February 1974) was an American screenwriter, as well as an author of children's books, novels, and short stories.

Life 
Willson was born in Estherville, Iowa to John David Willson, a lawyer, and Rosalie Willson née Reiniger, a primary school teacher and piano tutor. In 1894 her parents moved to Mason City where her two brothers were born, John Cedric Willson and Robert Meredith Willson, who later came to prominence as the composer of the Broadway hit musical The Music Man.

Work 
Willson produced numerous children's books, as well as many short stories and poems. Her best-known children's book is titled Honey Bear and contains illustrations of Maginel Wright Barney, sister of Frank Lloyd Wright. The story, told in verse, is about a baby being taken from his bassinet and into the forest by a bear. Tom Wolfe cites the book as the one which first made him wish to be a writer.

In Where the World Folds Up at Night, Willson chronicled the daily operations of the Ringling Brothers and Barnum and Bailey Circus, with which she performed for a brief time. Several other circus-themed books, including Little Texas and Mystery in Spangles, owe much to her close friend Bird Millman, a high-wire artist to whom she dedicated Honey Bear.

Books 
 Pinky-Pup. P.F. Volland Co., Chicago 1922.
 Pinky Pup and The Empty Elephant. P.F. Volland Co., New York 1922.
 Honey Bear. Algonquin Publishing Co., New York 1923.
 The Empty Elephant. P.F. Volland Co., New York 1923.
 Clown Town. Doubleday, Page & Co, Garden City, New York 1924.
 A Circus ABC. Frederick A. Stokes Co., New York 1924.
 Little Texas: A Story of the Circus. D. Appleton & Co., New York 1925.
 Tuffy Good Luck. P.F. Volland Co., New York 1927.
 Games For Grown Ups. written with Harriet Eager Davis, Delineator Service, New York 1929.
 Five Minute Plays. Delineator Service, New York 1930.
 Once Upon A Monday. P.F. Volland Co., Joliet 1931.
 Where The World Folds Up at Night. D. Appleton & Co., New York 1932.
 Favorite Stories of Famous Children. Henry Holt & Co., New York 1938.
 Hostess of the Skyways. Dodd, Mead & Co, New York 1941.
 Hollywood Starlet. Dodd, Mead & Co., New York 1942.
 Mystery of the Scarlet Staircase. Dodd, Mead & Co., New York 1946.
 The Veiled Mystery. Dodd, Mead & Co., New York 1948.
 Three Buckaroos. John Martin's House, 1950.
 Way Out West: A Cowboy Story.  P.F. Volland Co., 1950.
 Mystery in Spangles. Dodd, Mead & Co., New York 1950.

Screenplays and film adaptations 
 1923 The Age of Desire
 1926 God Gave Me 20-Cents Co-written by Elizabeth Meehan and Jack Russell
 1927 An Affair of the Follies (Here Y'Are, Brother) co-written by June Mathis and Carey Wilson, Al Rockett Productions
 1928 Three-Ring Marriage (Help Yourself to Hay)
 1932 Ebb Tide (God Gave Me 20-Cents)

Short stories (selection)

References

External links

 
 

1890 births
1974 deaths
American children's writers
People from Estherville, Iowa
Screenwriters from Iowa
American women screenwriters
20th-century American women writers
20th-century American screenwriters